Stephen Preston (1879 – unknown) was an English footballer who played as a forward. Born in Manchester, he was first signed as a trainee by Newton Heath in 1901 for the first of two spells with the club. In 1903, he was transferred to Stockport County, before rejoining Newton Heath (by now known as Manchester United) that same year. In 33 matches for Newton Heath/Manchester United, he scored 34 goals.

External links
Profile at StretfordEnd.co.uk
Profile at MUFCInfo.com

1879 births
Footballers from Manchester
English footballers
Association football forwards
Manchester United F.C. players
Stockport County F.C. players
Year of death missing